A fluorophore (or fluorochrome, similarly to a chromophore) is a fluorescent chemical compound that can re-emit light upon light excitation. Fluorophores typically contain several combined aromatic groups, or planar or cyclic molecules with several π bonds.

Fluorophores are sometimes used alone, as a tracer in fluids, as a dye for staining of certain structures, as a substrate of enzymes, or as a probe or indicator (when its fluorescence is affected by environmental aspects such as polarity or ions). More generally they are covalently bonded to a macromolecule, serving as a marker (or dye, or tag, or reporter) for affine or bioactive reagents (antibodies, peptides, nucleic acids). Fluorophores are notably used to stain tissues, cells, or materials in a variety of analytical methods, i.e., fluorescent imaging and spectroscopy.

Fluorescein, via its amine-reactive isothiocyanate derivative fluorescein isothiocyanate (FITC), has been one of the most popular fluorophores. From antibody labeling, the applications have spread to nucleic acids thanks to carboxyfluorescein (FAM), TET, ...). Other historically common fluorophores are derivatives of rhodamine (TRITC), coumarin, and cyanine. Newer generations of fluorophores, many of which are proprietary, often perform better, being more photostable, brighter, and/or less pH-sensitive than traditional dyes with comparable excitation and emission.

Fluorescence 
The fluorophore absorbs light energy of a specific wavelength and re-emits light at a longer wavelength. The absorbed wavelengths, energy transfer efficiency, and time before emission depend on both the fluorophore structure and its chemical environment, as the molecule in its excited state interacts surrounding molecules. Wavelengths of maximum absorption (≈ excitation) and emission (for example, Absorption/Emission = 485 nm/517 nm) are the typical terms used to refer to a given fluorophore, but the whole spectrum may be important to consider. The excitation wavelength spectrum may be a very narrow or broader band, or it may be all beyond a cutoff level. The emission spectrum is usually sharper than the excitation spectrum, and it is of a longer wavelength and correspondingly lower energy. Excitation energies range from ultraviolet through the visible spectrum, and emission energies may continue from visible light into the near infrared region.

Main characteristics of fluorophores are:
 Maximum excitation and emission wavelength (expressed in nanometers (nm)): corresponds to the peak in the excitation and emission spectra (usually one peak each).
 Molar absorption coefficient (in Molar−1cm−1): links the quantity of absorbed light, at a given wavelength, to the concentration of fluorophore in solution.
 Quantum yield: efficiency of the energy transferred from incident light to emitted fluorescence (= number of emitted photons per absorbed photons).
 Lifetime (in picoseconds): duration of the excited state of a fluorophore before returning to its ground state. It refers to the time taken for a population of excited fluorophores to decay to 1/e (≈0.368) of the original amount.
 Stokes shift: difference between the maximum excitation and maximum emission wavelengths.
 Dark fraction: proportion of the molecules active in fluorescence emission. For quantum dots, prolonged single-molecule microscopy showed that 20-90% of all particles never emit fluorescence. On the other hand, conjugated polymer nanoparticles (Pdots) show almost no dark fraction in their fluorescence. Fluorescent proteins can have a dark fraction from protein misfolding or defective chromophore formation.

These characteristics drive other properties, including the photobleaching or photoresistance (loss of fluorescence upon continuous light excitation). Other parameters should be considered, as the polarity of the fluorophore molecule, the fluorophore size and shape (i.e. for polarization fluorescence pattern), and other factors can change the behavior of fluorophores.

Fluorophores can also be used to quench the fluorescence of other fluorescent dyes (see article Quenching (fluorescence)) or to relay their fluorescence at even longer wavelength (see article Förster resonance energy transfer (FRET)).

See more on fluorescence principle.

Size (molecular weight) 
Most fluorophores are organic small molecules of 20 - 100 atoms (200 - 1000 Dalton - the molecular weight may be higher depending on grafted modifications, and conjugated molecules), but there are also much larger natural fluorophores that are proteins: green fluorescent protein (GFP) is 27 kDa and several phycobiliproteins (PE, APC...) are ≈240kDa. In 2020, the smallest known fluorophore was claimed to be 3-hydroxyisonicotinaldehyde, a compound of 14 atoms and only 123 Da.

Fluorescence particles like quantum dots: 2-10 nm diameter, 100-100,000 atoms, are also considered fluorophores.

The size of the fluorophore might sterically hinder the tagged molecule, and affect the fluorescence polarity.

Families 

Fluorophore molecules could be either utilized alone, or serve as a fluorescent motif of a functional system. Based on molecular complexity and synthetic methods, fluorophore molecules could be generally classified into four categories: proteins and peptides, small organic compounds, synthetic oligomers and polymers, and multi-component systems.

Fluorescent proteins GFP (green), YFP (yellow) and RFP (red) can be attached to other specific proteins to form a fusion protein, synthesized in cells after transfection of a suitable plasmid carrier.

Non-protein organic fluorophores belong to following major chemical families:
 Xanthene derivatives: fluorescein, rhodamine, Oregon green, eosin, and Texas red
 Cyanine derivatives: cyanine, indocarbocyanine, oxacarbocyanine, thiacarbocyanine, and merocyanine
 Squaraine derivatives and ring-substituted squaraines, including Seta and Square dyes
 Squaraine rotaxane derivatives: See Tau dyes
 Naphthalene derivatives (dansyl and prodan derivatives)
 Coumarin derivatives
 Oxadiazole derivatives: pyridyloxazole, nitrobenzoxadiazole and benzoxadiazole
 Anthracene derivatives: anthraquinones, including DRAQ5, DRAQ7 and CyTRAK Orange
 Pyrene derivatives: cascade blue, etc.
 Oxazine derivatives: Nile red, Nile blue, cresyl violet, oxazine 170, etc.
 Acridine derivatives: proflavin, acridine orange, acridine yellow, etc.
 Arylmethine derivatives: auramine, crystal violet, malachite green
 Tetrapyrrole derivatives: porphin, phthalocyanine, bilirubin
 Dipyrromethene derivatives: BODIPY, aza-BODIPY

These fluorophores fluoresce due to delocalized electrons which can jump a band and stabilize the energy absorbed. Benzene, one of the simplest aromatic hydrocarbons, for example, is excited at 254 nm and emits at 300 nm. This discriminates fluorophores from quantum dots, which are fluorescent semiconductor nanoparticles.

They can be attached to protein to specific functional groups, such as - amino groups (active ester, carboxylate, isothiocyanate, hydrazine), carboxyl groups (carbodiimide), thiol (maleimide, acetyl bromide), organic azide (via click chemistry or non-specifically (glutaraldehyde)).

Additionally, various functional groups can be present to alter its properties, such as solubility, or confer special properties, such as boronic acid which binds to sugars or multiple carboxyl groups to bind to certain cations. When the dye contains an electron-donating and an electron-accepting group at opposite ends of the aromatic system, this dye will probably be sensitive to the environment's polarity (solvatochromic), hence called environment-sensitive. Often dyes are used inside cells, which are impermeable to charged molecules, as a result of this the carboxyl groups are converted into an ester, which is removed by esterases inside the cells, e.g., fura-2AM and fluorescein-diacetate.

The following dye families are trademark groups, and do not necessarily share structural similarities.
 CF dye (Biotium)
 DRAQ and CyTRAK probes (BioStatus)
 BODIPY (Invitrogen)
 EverFluor (Setareh Biotech)
 Alexa Fluor (Invitrogen)
 Bella Fluor (Setareh Biotech)
 DyLight Fluor (Thermo Scientific, Pierce)
 Atto and Tracy (Sigma Aldrich)
 FluoProbes (Interchim)
 Abberior Dyes (Abberior)
 DY and MegaStokes Dyes (Dyomics)
 Sulfo Cy dyes (Cyandye)
 HiLyte Fluor (AnaSpec)
 Seta, SeTau and Square Dyes (SETA BioMedicals)
 Quasar and Cal Fluor dyes (Biosearch Technologies)
 SureLight Dyes (APC, RPEPerCP, Phycobilisomes) (Columbia Biosciences)
 APC, APCXL, RPE, BPE (Phyco-Biotech, Greensea, Prozyme, Flogen)
 Vio Dyes (Miltenyi Biotec)

Examples of frequently encountered fluorophores

Reactive and conjugated dyes

Abbreviations:
Ex (nm): Excitation wavelength in nanometers
Em (nm): Emission wavelength in nanometers
MW: Molecular weight
QY: Quantum yield

Nucleic acid dyes

Cell function dyes

Fluorescent proteins

Abbreviations:
Ex (nm): Excitation wavelength in nanometers
Em (nm): Emission wavelength in nanometers
MW: Molecular weight
QY: Quantum yield
BR: Brightness: Molar absorption coefficient * quantum yield / 1000
PS: Photostability: time [sec] to reduce brightness by 50%

Applications 

Fluorophores have particular importance in the field of biochemistry and protein studies, e.g., in immunofluorescence but also in cell analysis, e.g. immunohistochemistry
 and small molecule sensors.

Uses outside the life sciences 

Additionally fluorescent dyes find a wide use in industry, going under the name of "neon colours", such as:
 Multi-ton scale usages in textile dyeing and optical brighteners in laundry detergents
 Advanced cosmetic formulations; safety equipment and clothing
 Organic light-emitting diodes (OLED)
 Fine arts and design (posters and paintings)
 Synergists for insecticides and experimental drugs
 As a dye in highlighters to give off a glow-like effect
 Solar panels to collect more light / wavelengths
 Fluorescent sea dye is used to help airborne search and rescue teams locate objects in the water

See also 
 :Category:Fluorescent dyes
 Fluorescence in the life sciences
 Quenching of fluorescence
 Fluorescence recovery after photobleaching (FRAP) - an application for quantifying mobility of molecules in lipid bilayers.

References

External links 
 The Database of fluorescent dyes
 Table of fluorochromes
 The Molecular Probes Handbook - a comprehensive resource for fluorescence technology and its applications.

Dyes
Luminescence